The Pingtung Performing Arts Center is a performance center in Pingtung City, Pingtung County, Taiwan. The performing arts center is Southern Taiwan’s first county/city-level concert hall with a pipe organ. Built by the Alexander Schuke Potsdam Orgelbau company in 2013, the bamboo organ has 3 manuals, 45 stops and 2,793 pipes.

Architecture
The arts center consists of music hall, multipurpose theater and open air plaza with a capacity of 1,200 audiences. The building is designed with Southern Taiwan architectural style.

Transportation
The arts center is accessible within walking distance east of Pingtung Station of Taiwan Railways.

See also
 List of tourist attractions in Taiwan

References

External links

  

Buildings and structures in Pingtung County
Performing arts centers in Taiwan